Hindu Satkar Samity is a Hindu charitable organization based in Kolkata that performs the cremation of unclaimed Hindu corpses. The Hindu Satkar Samity is the only body authorized to carry the dead bodies of Hindus in the hearses and cremate them. It was founded in 1932.

Facilities 
In 2005, the Samity bought a six-bed mortuary cooler that can preserve a corpse for two days, in order to cater the NRI people. However, the Samity couldn't set up the mortuary in its Burrabazar premises, because of objections from the local people. Subsequently, the Samity had requested the Kolkata Municipal Corporation to allot plot of land for setting up the mortuary.

References 

Crematoria in India
Hindu organisations based in India
Organisations based in Kolkata
Religious organizations established in 1932
1932 establishments in India